Eupithecia holti is a moth in the family Geometridae. It is found in Russia (the South Siberian Mountains).

References

Moths described in 1973
holti
Moths of Asia